Russell Wilson (born 1988) is an American football quarterback.

Russell Wilson may also  refer to:

 Russell Wilson (Canadian politician) (1864–1936), mayor of Saskatoon, Saskatchewan, Canada
 Russell Wilson (American politician) (1876–1946), mayor of Cincinnati, Ohio, United States
 Russell Wilson (cricketer) (born 1959), English cricketer
 Russell T. Wilson, mathematics professor and college basketball and baseball coach in the first part of the 20th century

See also
 Russell Willson (1883–1948), American vice admiral